The Principality Building Society is a building society based in Cardiff, Wales. With assets of £11bn it is the largest building society in Wales and the sixth largest in the United Kingdom. Principality Building Society is mutual, which means it is owned by its members rather than shareholders. It serves clients through the internet and telephone as well as at high street branches.  It is a member of the Building Societies Association.

History

1860-1960

The Society was formed in Cardiff in 1860 under the lengthy name of the Principality Permanent Benefit Building and Investment Society; the “Benefit” was dropped in 1876 when it incorporated under the 1874 Building Society Act, and to its present name in 1913. The trustees were local dignitaries and the directors largely tradesmen and merchants. It did not have its first office until 1870 and although it had an early agency, it remained a small local society. Despite this, the Principality was able to claim to be “the largest by far in Wales and the West of England” when it gave evidence to a House of Commons Committee in 1893. By 1910, the Society had some 6,000 accounts and was large enough to have its own office in 1914. It was not until the 1930s that the Society appeared to make any significant move away from Cardiff, when branches were opened in Swansea and Barry in 1934. Given the boom in private housing and the subsequent impact of inflation, the Society’s asset growth remained modest – from £2m in 1932 to £3m in 1947. Expansion from the 1930s appeared to come mainly from agencies and by 1960 these totalled around 50.

Post 1960

From 1960 the pace of expansion appeared to increase. Important branch openings were Chester in 1960 and London in 1963. The Principality also began to acquire smaller Welsh societies, three between 1959 and 1968. During that decade assets grew from £9m to £34m. In the 1970s there were a further five acquisitions but a much greater emphasis on organic expansion through new branches – over 20 in the decade. Branch openings continued through the 1980s and in 1991 assets reached £1billion. By then, the branch network was established and although there was the occasional new opening, the asset growth came from its existing structure, with private mortgage lending supplemented by the formation of a commercial lending division in 2002. Today, those assets stand at £11bn.

Diversification

Principality acquired Parkhurst and Peter Alan estate agents in 1987, and the merged entity was later sold to Connells Group for £16.4m in 2014. A site for a new head office to accommodate the expanding business was acquired in 1989 and Principality House in The Friary was opened in 1992.

The company acquired Loan Link Limited in 2004. This gave Nemo Personal Finance Ltd, a subsidiary, the opportunity to launch in 2005. In 2013 the company acquired Mead Property Services (covering Buckinghamshire, Berkshire and Oxfordshire) and Thomas George (covering Cardiff and south Wales).

On 8 September 2015, Principality Building Society announced that they had purchased the naming rights to the Millennium Stadium in a 10-year deal. Since 1 January 2016 it has been known as the Principality Stadium.

Mergers and acquisitions 
The following building societies merged into the Principality Building Society:

Bridgend Building Society in 1959
Urban Building Society	in 1962
Maesteg Permanent Benefit Society in 1968
Aberavon Mutual Permanent Building Society in 1974
Swansea & Carmarthen Building Society in 1974
Llanelli Permanent Building Society in 1977
District Building Society in 1978
Gorseinon Building Society in 1979
Chatham Building Society in 1985

Operations 

It has 53 branches and 18 agencies across Wales and the English border, and employs around 1,100 people. In 2005 it expanded into personal loans with the creation of a new company called Nemo Personal Finance Ltd. In the same year as launching Nemo Loans, Principality revamped its image. It won the 2005 'Business of the Year' award for Wales and the West Country. The assets of the group increased to £4.4bn in the same year and to £6.7bn in 2012.

References

External links

Principality Building Society
Building Societies Association

Building societies of Wales
Banks established in 1860
Organizations established in 1860
Economy of Cardiff
Organisations based in Cardiff
1860 establishments in Wales